"The Love Letter Is Dead" is a studio single by Gene Dante and The Future Starlets recorded in November 2009 at Q Division Studios and released in February 2010 by Omnirox Entertainment.  Upon its premier, the single placed No. 7 on the local radio airplay charts.  It remained on the charts for 16 months through September 2011, peaking at No. 2 in August 2011.

Track listing
 The Love Letter Is Dead

Personnel
 Gene Dante - lead and harmony vocals
 Scott Patalano - lead guitar
 Jim Collins - bass, harmony vocals
 Tamora Gooding - drums
 Erik Andersen - rhythm guitar

Additional musicians and instruments
 Female Harmony Vocals: Lisa Van Oosterum
 Mellotron and Synthesizer: Peter Lubin
 Orchestral Arrangements: Frank Ciampi

Production
 Producer: Peter Lubin
 Engineer: Jon Lupfer
 Mixed by: Peter Lubin & Jon Lupfer
 Assistant engineer: Jon Lukason
 Lyrics and music by Gene Dante
 Recorded at Q Division Studios in Somerville, MA
 Mastering: Mark Donahue (Sound Mirror)

Graphics
 Art direction and graphics: Gene Dante

Further reading
Boston Band Crush

References

2010 singles
2009 songs